Birds of a feather flock together is an English proverb.

Birds of a Feather may also refer to:

Film
Birds of a Feather (1917 film), a film starring Harold Lloyd
Birds of a Feather (1931 film), Walt Disney Silly Symphony animated short
Birds of a Feather (1936 film), a British comedy directed by John Baxter
Birds of a Feather (2011 film), a comedy film written and directed by Anthony Meindl
Birds of a Feather (2019 film), a German animated adventure film

Television 
Birds of a Feather (TV series), British television sitcom 1989–1998, 2014–2020
"Birds of a Feather" (Batman: The Animated Series) episode
"Birds of a Feather" (The Dresden Files) episode
"Birds of a Feather" (Highway to Heaven) episode
"Birds of a Feather" (Murder, She Wrote) episode

Music

Band 
 Birds of a Feather (British band), early name of group later known as The Chanter Sisters
Birds of a Feather, a jazz group produced by Dan Siegel

Albums
Birds of a Feather (Carmen McRae album), 1958
Birds of A Feather, Self-titled album by the band Birds of A Feather, 1987
Birds of a Feather (Roy Haynes album), 2001
Birds of a Feather or the title song, by Rough Trade, 1985

Songs
"Birds of a Feather" (Joe South song), 1968; covered by the Raiders, 1971
"Birds of a Feather" (Killing Joke song), 1982
"Birds of a Feather" (Phish song), 1998
"Birds of a Feather", a song by Cliff Richard and Peabo Bryson, from Richard's album Soulicious, 2011

Other uses
Birds of a feather (computing), in the Internet Engineering Task Force, an informal discussion group or session
Birds of a Feather, a 2004 Maisie Dobbs novel by Jacqueline Winspear
"Birds of a Feather" an Electron Rocket launch for the NRO

See also
Bentvueghels (lit. "Birds of a Feather"), a group of Dutch and Flemish artists active in 17th-century Rome
Homophily, the tendency of individuals to associate with similar others
"Lele pū nā manu like" (lit. "Birds of a Feather"), an episode of Hawaii Five-0